Betun is the capital of Malaka Regency, East Nusa Tenggara, Indonesia. Aside from Atambua, this city is also one of the shelters for refugees from neighboring East Timor, who fled because of the violence and destruction that erupted after East Timor voted for independence from Indonesia in 1999. When violence erupted in East Timor in 2006, there was again an influx of refugees.

Betun is a town located in West Timor which serves as the capital of Malaka Regency.

References

Populated places in East Nusa Tenggara
Regency seats of East Nusa Tenggara
West Timor